Bobby Ladner is an American football coach and former player. He served as the head football coach at Anderson University in Anderson, Indiana from 2012 to 2014, compiling a record of 2–28.  Ladner resigned from his post at Anderson following the 2014 season.  Prior to his stint at Anderson, Ladner was an assistant football coach at Olivet Nazarene University and Concordia College Alabama.  He played college football at Belhaven University.

Head coaching record

References

Year of birth missing (living people)
Living people
Anderson Ravens football coaches
Belhaven Blazers football players
Concordia College (Alabama) Hornets football coaches
Olivet Nazarene Tigers football coaches